HIM is an ITV drama miniseries, consisting of three 60-minute episodes. The series follows a boy referred to only as HIM (Fionn Whitehead) who discovers that he has telekinetic powers.

Cast
Fionn Whitehead - HIM
James Murray - Edward, HIM's father.
Katherine Kelly - Hannah, HIM's mother.
Patrick Robinson - Victor, Hannah's new husband and HIM's step-father.
Lucy Liemann - Beth, Edward's new wife and HIM's step-mother. 
Simona Brown - Faith, Victor's daughter and HIM's step-sister.
Bobby Smalldridge - Jack, Hannah's son and HIM's step-brother.
Susan Jameson - Rose, Edward's mother and HIM's grandmother.
Alec Newman - Ross Brodie, HIM's psychiatrist. 
Angela Bruce - Fran, a nurse that looks after Rose.
David McKell - Jamie, HIM's friend. 
Aaron Phagura - Azfal, HIM's friend. 
Anastasia Hille - Magda Elliot, Professor of Psychic Research.

Episodes
HIM aired in three sixty minute episodes. Filming began in suburban London in January 2016.

References

External links
HIM at ITV Hub

Production website at Mainstreet Pictures

2016 British television series debuts
2016 British television series endings
2010s British drama television series
2010s British television miniseries
British supernatural television shows
English-language television shows
ITV television dramas
Television shows about telekinesis
Television shows set in the United Kingdom
British fantasy television series